A cephalochordate (from Greek: κεφαλή kephalé, "head" and χορδή khordé, "chord") is an animal in the chordate subphylum, Cephalochordata. They are commonly called lancelets. Cephalochordates possess 5 synapomorphies, or primary characteristics, that all chordates have at some point during their larval or adulthood stages. These 5 synapomorphies include a notochord, dorsal hollow nerve cord, endostyle, pharyngeal slits, and a post-anal tail (see chordate for descriptions of each). The fine structure of the cephalochordate notochord is best known for the Bahamas lancelet, Asymmetron lucayanum. Cephalochordates are represented in modern oceans by the Amphioxiformes and are commonly found in warm temperate and tropical seas worldwide. With the presence of a notochord, adult amphioxus are able to swim and tolerate the tides of coastal environments, but they are most likely to be found within the sediment of these communities.

Cephalochordates are segmented marine animals that possess elongated bodies containing a notochord that extends the length of the body from head to tail. They are only a few centimeters in length and due to their lack of a mineralized skeleton, their presence in the fossil record is minimal. A few fossils have been found such as the Burgess Shale of British Columbia which contained the fossils of Pikaia, and the Yunnanozoon fossil which also dates back to the Cambrian period.

Cephalochordates are thought to have diverged from the rest of the chordate subphylum approximately 700 to 650 million years ago. Phylogeny is based on a combination of studies of extinct and extant species.

Morphology 

The general cephalochordate body plan is considered to be a dorsoventrally flipped version of earlier deuterostomes. Gene-expression studies on embryonic patterning suggest that body axis formation has inverted somewhere between hemichordates and chordates, where the ventral formation of body structures in earlier hemichordates is observed to be dorsal in cephalochordates.

Studies have shown that there is a correlation between the branchiomeric muscles of vertebrates with the orobranchial muscles within the pharynx of chordates. The branchiomeric muscles of vertebrates consist of the pharyngeal and laryngeal muscles whereas the orobranchial muscles of chordates consist of the gill and mouth muscles/cavity. These orobranchial muscles begin to develop in the early larval stages of the cephalochordates. The muscles eventually form into the adult hood during metamorphosis. Specific gene expression and neuron pathways suggest the homological connections between vertebrates and the nonvertebral cephalochordates. The Brachyury gene expression of the notochord is just one of the few genetic characteristics that give evidence to homological connections of the vertebral and cephalochordate. Although there are evolutionary connections between the two groups, their functions of the notochord are no longer the same over time. The notochord consists of striated muscles that form a tough, cylinder rod along the back of the cephalochordate. The notochord of the cephalochordate is functioned to allow body movement within their water environment whereas vertebrates use the notochord for body formation.

Feeding 

Cephalochordates have developed a filter feeding system, called the oral hood, that serves as the entrance for incoming food particles. The free edge of the oral hood contains Buccal cirri, small filament-like projections, that assist in sifting out larger food particles before they enter the buccal cavity. These projections are chemoreceptors that stimulate the epithelial cilia lining inside the walls of the oral hood to bring food particles into the mouth. The coordinated movement of several ciliated tracts help facilitate food ingestion through a rotating motion that is similar to that of a wheel, causing cilia to be referred to as “wheel organ”. One of these ciliated tracts located on the oral hood forms a ciliated cavity, called Hatschek's pit, which aids in food collection by secreting mucous into the buccal cavity to capture food particles. Located behind the buccal cirri is the velum, which acts as an internal filter before food enters the pharynx. The food particles adhere to secreted mucus on the pharyngeal bars before transferring to the epibranchial groove on the dorsal side of the pharynx. Food particles are then transported to the gut while excess water is pumped out of the pharynx through the pharyngeal slits. The excess water excretes from the body using a single atriopore of the atrium.

Distribution 
Cephalochordates are typically distributed in tropical and temperate shallow seas. It was believed for a long time, that cephalochordates prefer aerobic conditions, but there has been a new cephalochordate (Asymmetron inferum) discovered in an anaerobic and sulfide-rich bottom.

References

 
Extant Cambrian first appearances
Taxa named by Ernst Haeckel